Ghizzoni is an Italian surname. It may refer to:

Federico Ghizzoni (born 1955), Italian businessman and banker
Paolo Ghizzoni, bishop in Roman Catholic Diocese of San Miniato
Serafino Ghizzoni (born 1954), Italian international rugby union footballer

Italian-language surnames